Cinema Express Awards are presented annually by Indian Express Group on behalf of Cinema Express film magazine to honour artistic excellence of professionals in the south Indian film industry which comprises Tamil, Telugu, Kannada and Malayalam film industries. The awards were introduced in 1981. From 1987 the awards were extended to many categories.

Prizes

Tamil 
 Cinema Express Award for Best Film – Tamil
 Cinema Express Award for Best Director – Tamil
 Cinema Express Award for Best Actor – Tamil
 Cinema Express Award for Best Actress – Tamil

Kannada 
 Cinema Express Award for Best Film – Kannada
 Cinema Express Award for Best Director – Kannada
 Cinema Express Award for Best Actor – Kannada
 Cinema Express Award for Best Actress – Kannada

Telugu 
 Cinema Express Award for Best Film – Telugu
 Cinema Express Award for Best Director – Telugu
 Cinema Express Award for Best Actor – Telugu
 Cinema Express Award for Best Actress – Telugu

Malayalam 
 Cinema Express Award for Best Film – Malayalam
 Cinema Express Award for Best Director – Malayalam
 Cinema Express Award for Best Actor – Malayalam
 Cinema Express Award for Best Actress – Malayalam

Events 
 7th Cinema Express Awards
 8th Cinema Express Awards
 9th Cinema Express Awards
 12th Cinema Express Awards
 13th Cinema Express Awards
 14th Cinema Express Awards

References

External links 
 

 
Indian Express Limited
Indian film awards
Awards established in 1981
1981 establishments in India

Telugu film awards
Tamil film awards